Cha Han-sik (born 9 February 1965) is a South Korean middle-distance runner. He competed in the men's 3000 metres steeplechase at the 1988 Summer Olympics.

References

1965 births
Living people
Athletes (track and field) at the 1988 Summer Olympics
South Korean male middle-distance runners
South Korean male steeplechase runners
Olympic athletes of South Korea
Place of birth missing (living people)